Burley Municipal Airport  is a mile northeast of Burley, in Cassia County, Idaho.  The airport was rededicated as Burley J R Jack Simplot Airport in October 2002, honoring J. R. "Jack" Simplot.

History 
A stop on the Contract Air Mail Route 5 (CAM5) from Salt Lake City to Pasco, the airport began its life servicing Air Mail aircraft.

The first airline flights were Empire Airlines Boeing 247s in 1946; successors West Coast Airlines and Air West landed at Burley until 1969.

Facilities

In the year ending February 10, 2005, the airport had 27,750 aircraft operations, average 76 per day: 98% general aviation, 1% air taxi and <1% military. 56 aircraft are based at this airport:
84% single-engine, 10% multi-engine, 4% jet and 2% ultralight.

Accidents and incidents 

 On April 13, 2022, a Cessna 208B Caravan registration N928JP on a cargo flight operated by Gem Air from Salt Lake City International Airport crashed while on approach to the airport. The pilot and only occupant on board was fatally injured.

References

External links 
Burley Municipal Airport at Idaho Transportation Department

Airports in Idaho
Buildings and structures in Cassia County, Idaho
Transportation in Cassia County, Idaho